The Eltanin impact is thought to be an asteroid impact in the eastern part of the South Pacific Ocean that occurred around the Pliocene-Pleistocene boundary approximately 2.51 ± 0.07  million years ago. No crater associated with the impact has been discovered. The impact likely evaporated  of water, generating large tsunami waves hundreds of metres high.

Description 
The possible impact site was first discovered in 1981 as an iridium anomaly in sediment cores collected by the research vessel Eltanin, after which the site and impactor are named. Later studies were done by the vessel Polarstern. Sediments from the Eocene and Paleocene were jumbled and deposited again chaotically. Also mixed in were melted and fragmented meteorite matter. Of this, 87% is melted and 13% only fragmented. This area is the region of the Earth's surface with the highest known density of meteorite material coverage.

The disturbed sediment had three layers. The lowermost layer SU IV is a chaotic mixture of crumbled sediments in the form of a breccia. Above this is layer SU III consisting of layered sand deposited from turbulently flowing water.  Above this is SU II layer with meteorite fragments and graded silt and clay that settled out of still but dirty water.

Asteroid 
The possible size of the asteroid was calculated by the amount of iridium found in the disturbed sediments.

The composition of the meteorites classifies them as low metal mesosiderites. The meteorite explosion would also have produced microspherules under half a millimeter in diameter. Some of these are glass, and others have spinel and pyroxene. Elements enriched include calcium, aluminium and titanium.

Tsunami 
On the shorelines of the Pacific Ocean there are erosional features that are indicative of a very large tsunami. These include an erosional surface and chaotic deposits of mixed terrestrial and ocean-derived sediment. Boulders as big as buses are mixed with marine fossils and mud. The most well-characterised tsunami deposits are near the coast of Chile. Off the coast of Antarctica there are mudslides into the deep ocean from this age.

The size of a possible tsunami has been calculated.

Ice age trigger 
At the time of the impact in the Late Pliocene, the Earth was cooling; but the impact and disruption to the weather could have triggered the start of ice cap formation in the Northern Hemisphere.  The impact would have put a large amount of water and salt into the atmosphere, disrupted ice shelves, depleted the ozone layer, caused surface acidification, and increased the Earth's albedo.

See also
 Karakul crater – a large impact crater which may be just a few million years older than Eltanin
 List of possible impact structures on Earth

References

External links 
 
 

Hypothetical impact events
Possible impact craters on Earth
Pleistocene South America
Pleistocene impact craters
Megatsunamis
Geology of the Pacific Ocean